Indonesia competed at the 2004 Summer Olympics in Athens, Greece, from 13 to 29 August 2004. This was the nation's twelfth appearance at the Olympics, excluding the 1964 Summer Olympics in Tokyo, and the 1980 Summer Olympics in Moscow because of the United States boycott. Krisna Bayu was originally the flag bearer, however the role was later done by Christian Hadinata because Bayu was suffering from flu at the eve of opening ceremony.

Medalists

| width="78%" align="left" valign="top"|  

| width="22%" align="left" valign="top"|

| width="22%" align="left" valign="top"|

| width="22%" align="left" valign="top" |

Competitors 
The following is the list of number of competitors participating in the Games:

Archery 

Two Indonesian archers qualified each for the men's and women's individual archery.

Athletics 

Indonesian athletes have so far achieved qualifying standards in the following athletics events (up to a maximum of 3 athletes in each event at the 'A' Standard, and 1 at the 'B' Standard).

Men

Women

Badminton 

Men

Women

Mixed

Boxing 

Indonesia sent one boxer to the 2004 Summer Olympics.

Canoeing 

Sprint

Qualification Legend: Q = Qualify to final; q = Qualify to semifinal

Cycling

Track 
Omnium

Judo 

Indonesia has qualified a single judoka.

Rowing 

Indonesian rowers qualified the following boats:
Women

Qualification Legend: FA=Final A (medal); FB=Final B (non-medal); FC=Final C (non-medal); FD=Final D (non-medal); FE=Final E (non-medal); FF=Final F (non-medal); SA/B=Semifinals A/B; SC/D=Semifinals C/D; SE/F=Semifinals E/F; R=Repechage

Sailing 

Indonesian sailors have qualified one boat for each of the following events.
Men

M = Medal race; OCS = On course side of the starting line; DSQ = Disqualified; DNF = Did not finish; DNS= Did not start; RDG = Redress given

Shooting 

Women

Swimming 

Men

Taekwondo 

Indonesia has qualified two taekwondo jin.

Tennis

Weightlifting 

Six Indonesian weightlifters qualified for the following events:
Men

Women

See also
 2004 Olympic Games
 2004 Paralympic Games
 Indonesia at the Olympics
 Indonesia at the Paralympics
 Indonesia at the 2004 Summer Paralympics

References

External links
Official Report of the XXVIII Olympiad
National Sports Committee of Indonesia 

Nations at the 2004 Summer Olympics
2004
Summer Olympics